Jean de Tournes (1539–1615) was a French author, printer, book publisher and bookseller, and member of the long-lasting family printing business founded by his father Jean de Tournes. He was the father of Jean de Tournes (1593–1669).

Life
Jean de Tournes was born in 1539. He took over his father's printing and publishing business in 1564. He was a Huguenot protestant. In 1567, during the French Wars of Religion, his press was sacked and he was imprisoned for two months. He was imprisoned again in 1572, but escaped the Saint Bartholemew's Day Massacre. In 1585, following the edict of Henri III that protestants must abjure their religion or leave the country, he moved to Geneva. He began printing there in about 1590.  He became a bourgeois in 1596, and a member of the Conseil des Deux Cents in 1604. He died in 1615 and was succeeded in the family firm by his son Jean de Tournes.

The emblem of the de Tournes press was two entwined vipers.

References

1539 births
1615 deaths
French printers
French book publishers (people)
Swiss printers
Swiss book publishers (people)